The following is a list of notable alumni of University Senior High School.  The list includes all notable former pupils who attended the school anytime since opening its doors in 1924, including for the four years it was named "Warren G. Harding High School".

Desi Arnaz Jr. (actor, son of Desi Arnaz and Lucille Ball)
Mackenzie Astin 1991 (actor)
Eric Avery (rock bassist, Jane's Addiction)
Sondra E. Berchin 1970 (entertainment attorney and executive, MCA Universal)
Jan Berry 1959 (singer and songwriter, Jan and Dean)
Noel Blanc 1956
David Bonderman (billionaire)
Karla Bonoff (singer/songwriter, "Someone To Lay Down Beside Me", "Lose Again", "Tell Me Why")
Jeff Bridges 1967 (Oscar-winning actor)
Susie Bright (author and activist)
James Brolin (actor, Marcus Welby, M.D., Westworld)
David Cassidy (actor, The Partridge Family)
David Charvet 1991 (actor, Baywatch)
Alex Cline 1974 (drummer, Homogenized Goo)
Nels Cline 1974 (guitarist, Wilco and The Nels Cline Singers)
Glenn Cowan (table tennis player)
Darby Crash, born Jan Paul Beahm (punk rock pioneer, the Germs)
Faye Dancer 1941 (baseball player)
Richard Dean, born Richard Cowen (athlete, model, photographer)
Sandra Dee, born Alexandra Zuck, 1958 (actress, Gidget)
John Densmore (rock drummer, The Doors)
Pat Doyle (baseball coach)
Bobby Driscoll (Academy Award-winning child star)
Elonka Dunin 1976 (cryptographer and game developer)
John Ecker 1966 (basketball player and coach)
Danny Elfman (musician, Oingo Boingo, film composer)
Richard Elliot 1978 (Musician)
Raymond C. Fisher (jurist)
Vince Flaherty (film producer, actor, songwriter, musician and recording artist)
Megan Follows 1986 (actress)
Kim Fowley 1958 (rock musician, music producer)
Gil Fronsdal (Buddhist teacher and author)
Annette Funicello 1960 (actress, Mickey Mouse Club)
Judy Garland (singer, actress, Dorothy in The Wizard of Oz)
Peggy Ann Garner (actress, A Tree Grows in Brooklyn)
Jill Gibson 1960 (singer and artist)
Omar Gooding (actor)
Barry Gordon 1966 (actor, A Thousand Clowns; longest-running president of Screen Actors Guild) 
Kim Gordon (rock bassist, Sonic Youth)
Gregory Phillip Grunberg 1984 (actor in Felicity, Heroes, Alias)
Jane Harman 1962 (Congresswoman for California's 36th Congressional District 1993–99, 2001–11)
Jason Hervey 1990 (actor, Wayne Arnold on The Wonder Years)
Andy Hill 1968, 3x college national champion basketball player, President of CBS Productions and Channel One News, author, and motivational speaker
Leonard Hill, television producer and real estate developer
Daryl Hobbs 1987 (professional football player for Oakland Raiders, New Orleans Saints and Seattle Seahawks)
Tony Horton professional baseball player for Boston Red Sox, and Cleveland Indians
Wanda Jackson, film and television actress
Bruce Johnston (Beach Boys singer-songwriter, Grammy Award winner 1976 for Song of the Year "I Write The Songs")
Jack Jones 1956 (singer) Noted in yearbook as Allan Jones and Allan Jones Jr.
 Ethan Katz (born 1983), assistant pitching coach for the San Francisco Giants
Brian Kingman 1971 (professional baseball player for Oakland Athletics and San Francisco Giants)
Kundy Gutierrez 1996 (2015-2021 General Manager of the Mexico National Team Baseball)
Tom Karp (born 1946), tennis player
Werner Klemperer (actor)
Kathy Kohner-Zuckerman 1958 (the actual Gidget, on whom the novel Gidget, The Little Girl With the Big Ideas and subsequent film and television adaptations was based)
Patricia Krenwinkel, convicted murderer, member of Manson Family
Robby Krieger (rock guitarist and songwriter, The Doors)
Bill Lancaster (son of Burt Lancaster; writer of The Bad News Bears)
David Lang 1974 (Pulitzer prize-winning composer)
Nan Leslie (actress, Martha McGivern on TV series The Californians)
Lorna Luft 1968-70 (singer and actress, daughter of Judy Garland)
Betty Lynn (actress, Thelma Lou in The Andy Griffith Show)
Sue Lyon (actress, Lolita, Night of the Iguana)
Bryan MacLean 1964 (singer/composer, rock musician, Love)
Samantha Mathis 1988 (actress, The American President, Broken Arrow)
Kevin Millar 1988 (professional Baseball Player, Host of TV show Intentional Talk)
Doug McClure (TV and film actor, The Virginian)
Roddy McDowall, born Roderick McDowall, 1946 (actor, Planet of the Apes, Cleopatra)
Maria McKee 1982 (rock musician, Lone Justice)
Kevin Millar (professional baseball player)
Penelope Ann Miller (actress, Carlito's Way, Kindergarten Cop)
Andrew Mishkin 1976 (NASA Jet Propulsion Laboratory engineer, author)
Marilyn Monroe (iconic actress)
Jim Moret 1974 (television anchor)
Shelley Taylor Morgan (actress)
Remi Nadeau (Historian/author -City-Makers: The Men Who Transformed Los Angeles from Village to Metropolis During the First Great Boom, 1868-1876, The Water Seekers, Ghost Towns and Mining Camps of California: A History & Guide)
Dave Navarro (rock musician, Jane's Addiction)
Randy Newman (singer/composer, "I Love L.A.")
Julie Nimoy (producer and director, Remembering Leonard Nimoy)
Barbara Nwaba 2007 (heptathlete)
David Nwaba 2011 (basketball player, Lakers, Cleveland Cavaliers)
Ryan O'Neal (actor, Love Story, Barry Lyndon)
Pepper Paire 1942 (baseball player)
Mel Patton (1948 Olympic gold medal sprinter; former world record holder, 100 yd & 220 yd dash)
Paul Petersen (actor, The Donna Reed Show)
Stephen Reinhardt 1949 (judge, United States Court of Appeals for the Ninth Circuit)
Tommy Rettig 1959 (Jeff Miller in Lassie)
Herb Ritts (photographer)
Mary Lee Robb, born Mary Lee Robb Cline, 1944 (radio actress, The Great Gildersleeve)
Kira Roessler (Black Flag bassist)
Karly Rothenberg (actress, voice actor, The Office, American Vandal, Archibald’s Next Big Thing, That’s So Raven)
Bruce Schwartz 1973 (puppeteer)
Frank Sinatra Jr. (singer, conductor, son of Frank Sinatra)
Nancy Sinatra 1958 (singer, actress, daughter of Frank Sinatra)
Pat Smear, born George Ruthenberg (punk rock pioneer, the Germs, Nirvana and Foo Fighters musician)
Steve Smith Sr. (NFL wide receiver)
Felicia Stewart (doctor, author, advocate for morning-after pill)
Peter Stone  (writer for theater, television and film)
Glenn Sundby (gymnast)
Elizabeth Taylor (Oscar-winning actress)
Marshall Thompson (actor, To Hell and Back)
Tone Lōc, born Anthony Terrell Smith (hip-hop artist known for "Wild Thing" and "Funky Cold Medina")
Dean Torrence 1958 (singer, Jan & Dean)
Rick Van Santen 1980 (co-founder Coachella Valley Music and Arts Festival) 
Jay Walker (NFL quarterback, 1994–1998; Maryland House of Delegates District 26, 2006–present)
David Weissman (documentary filmmaker known for We Were Here and The Cockettes)
Howard Wolpe 1956 (Congressman for Michigan's 3rd Congressional District from 1979 to 1993)
Steve Wynn (musician, songwriter, The Dream Syndicate)
Titus Young (NFL wide receiver)
Jordan Zevon 1988 (musician, music producer, son of Warren Zevon)

References

External links 
 Official University High School website

 
University High School
University High School
University High School